Unlike the broad-gauge, the Victorian Railways'  narrow-gauge network never had four-wheeled trucks (aside from a handful of trollies). Instead, a single design of 249 underframes was constructed, with identical structure, bogies, couplers and brake equipment. Different bodies were provided on these frames for each purpose. The most common, by far, was the convertible flat/open truck, followed by cattle, louvred, insulated and boxcar types.

From 1926, all of the goods stock which had double-letter classification, were simplified to single-letter classification (e.g. NMM became NM). In more recent years, the E.T.R.B. has started a process of reclassifying all previously double-letter classified goods stock back to its original identities. This is in recognition of the adopted Era of Significance for the Railway, which covers period 1900–1930, during which time they mostly had the double letter coding.

The same frame design was later used for the second generation of NBH passenger carriages, after the first had been converted from NQR flat/open trucks.

Convertible Flat/Open trucks—NQR
The NQR class of trucks were the staple of the Victorian Railways' narrow gauge fleet. 218 examples were constructed between 1898 and 1914, designed as an open wagon with removable end panels as well as three drop-down but removable doors either side. When assembled into the open wagon format these wagons were designed to have the same capacity (weight and volume) as a normal broad gauge four-wheel open truck, to make load transferring easier at the interchange stations—Colac, Wangaratta, Upper Ferntree Gully and Moe.

The goods truck code had been derived from the conceptually similar broad-gauge QR trucks, which had removable sides to permit various types of loading. Previously, "Q" had been used for bogie flat wagons and "R" for bogie open trucks.

Letters and numbers were originally painted only on the end bulkheads and doors and the side doors, both of which could be removed as traffic dictated, and this made vehicle identification difficult until these details were transferred to the underframes of each truck. The superscript "N" changed to regular script in the goods vehicle recoding following the auto coupler conversion in 1926.

Some of these trucks were fitted with seats and frameworks supporting shelter to cater for holiday traffic on the Gembrook line. In particular, NQR trucks 114 and 140 were identified as having screw-type hand brakes fitted in addition to normal air brakes, permitting their use in lieu of brake vans—but only in the Up direction, and only for holiday traffic.

NBH
In April 1919 NQR wagons 31, 33, 36, 38, 39 and 46 were rebuilt into the first of the NBH passenger carriages, numbered 1 through 6 respectively and used for second-class passenger holiday traffic by adding seats, a removable roof on poles and tarps for wagon sides and doors. Over the years, a number of NQRs were provided with removable wood and steel frameworks with canvas roof canopies and side curtains, and internal seating to supplement the rest of the passenger stock during busy holiday periods. Puffing Billy has re-created these in modified form for emergency capacity. Five more NQRs, numbered 219–223, were built between 1990 and 1992 initially for passenger use so were fitted with the removable frames.

Flat wagons—NQ
In 1926 the class was relettered from NQR to NQ, reflecting their use more often than not as flat wagons rather than open wagons. Most of the class then remained in service until the early 1950s, when the four VR lines closed and mass scrappings of narrow-gauge stock began.

Puffing Billy Railway currently has NQRs 135 and 219–223 inclusive, fitted with seats and a canopy, and NQR 146 without a canopy.

The Railway also possesses untraffickable trucks: NQ 19 is configured for pulpwood while NQ 149 is fitted with a water tank that can hold  of water, and open NQRs 59, 92, 103, 125, 142, 151, 153 and 203. There are also six off-register NQR wagons, numbers 23, 26, 29, 94, 110 and 169.

Cattle trucks—NMM
This class consisted of 15 vehicles. Construction started in 1899, but the first NMM did not enter service until 1903. After this the rest of the class followed slowly, with the last of the class not entering service until 1917. They looked similar to the MM cattle trucks, despite being built 25 years earlier.

As part of the late 1920s recoding, the class was altered to NM. Around the same time, all but the class leader had autocouplers fitted (1 NM was not converted until 1941).

In the mid-1920s there was a derailment on the Moe–Walhalla line. In the consist were NM vehicles. It was determined that the derailment was caused by "spooked" horses in an NM vehicle. The vehicle was coupled next to an NA tank engine which was running bunker first. The smoke from the funnel apparently was the reason for the distress. After this investigation, the ends of all the NM class were progressively boarded up.

As the narrow-gauge lines were closed, the trucks were sold off. Most were scrapped; 13 NMM is used by Puffing Billy on wood trains, and 6 NM was recently rescued from a farm and is currently in storage awaiting restoration.

Louvred trucks—NUU
The standard louvred truck design for the Victorian narrow-gauge lines, the NUU vehicles, were constructed in three batches; the first seven from 1899 to 1901, an eighth in 1906 and the last six in 1911, for a total class of fourteen. They looked very similar to the U trucks of the broad-gauge. These trucks were painted white until approximately 1910, as shown in two photographs of NUU 1.

NU
In 1926 the class was relettered to simply NU, with no changes to numbers. NU 4 was scrapped in 1938, but otherwise the class remained intact until 1954, when seven members (2, 5, 7, 8, 9, 11 and 12) were sold to Coulston & Hyder, who dispersed the wagons among locations on the Wangarrata to Whitfield line. As of 1996, Nos. 7 and 12 were at Moyhu, while No. 11 was destroyed by fire in 1978. No. 2 is in private ownership on display in a museum at Erica. Nos. 6 and 1 were scrapped in 1957 and 1958 respectively, while in 1954 van 13 was recorded as being sold to the Puffing Billy Preservation Society. In 1977, the remaining vans 3, 10 and 14 were handed over to the Emerald Tourist Railway Board, and removed from Victorian Railways records. The Puffing Billy Railway now possesses vans 3, 8, 10, 13 and 14.

NW
It is worth noting that between 1972 and 1977, 10 NU was lettered as 10 NW, indicating its use as a workmen's sleeper.

Covered truck with explosives accommodation—NPH
In June 1910, it was decided that a truck for the transportation of explosives would be useful; probably for the Moe-Walhalla line as Walhalla was a gold-mining town and the rail line had been built from Moe to provide a faster means of transportation than bullock teams from the sailing boats from Melbourne to Port Albert/Sale via Heyfield.

NPH 1 was built on the standard design of underframe as most other narrow-gauge stock, but because it was not anticipated that explosives traffic would require use of the entire wagon, it was partitioned to give  capacity for explosives, while the remaining 6 tons was for general goods. Unlike the NU and NT classes, this meant that the van had four double doors total.

However, in late March 1911 the wagon had been converted to entirely general goods use, with the partition removed and a recoding to NH 1, the "H" in the class being a reference to the broad-gauge H covered trucks then in use. The vehicle was allowed to carry 10 tons of general goods.

It gained autocouplers in 1928, and was sold the scrap dealer Coulston & Hyder in 1954. By 1988, the vehicle had been found and was placed into the Puffing Billy Museum at Menzies Creek.

Insulated truck—NTT
In October 1899 a single insulated truck, NTT 1, was built for the transportation of goods that needed to be kept cold, such as raw meat and dairy products. Like the NUU trucks, it was painted white from new, being repainted the standard venetian red of goods stock from about 1910.

The truck was relettered to simply NT in 1926, but little else is known about the truck's history until 1988, when it was found and placed in Puffing Billy's Menzies Creek museum. Today, 1 NTT is used at Belgrave station for storage.

Preservation Era
Under the Emerald Tourist Railway Board, a range of rolling stock from other systems in Australia have been acquired and regauged for use on the Puffing Billy Railway to cater for the increased demand.

The primary example of goods vehicle is the acquisition from the Tasmanian Government Railways of a number of ballast hopper trucks. QG3 was the first to be converted for narrow gauge use, with an "N" prefix added. In 2003 the truck's identity was corrected to be consistent with Victorian Railways goods coding practise, with the new code of NNN1 representing the pre-1926 style. The N prefix is for "narrow" gauge, and the suffix indicating that it is a bogie wagon much like NUU, NTT, etc. above. However, unlike those examples, it is likely that the Victorian Railways would have retained the "NNN" code instead of simplifying to "NN", because there was already a broad-gauge ballast vehicle of that classification.

A second ex-TGR QG wagon has since entered service on Puffing Billy as NNN2.

References

 Narrow Gauge Rolling Stock
 Narrow Gauge Stock
 Puffing Billy Railway Rolling Stock

Rolling stock of Victoria (Australia)